Pavel Valeryevich Antipov (born September 19, 1991) is a Russian professional basketball. Standing at 2.04 m (6'8.5"), he plays at the power forward positions.

Professional career
Antipov has played with the following clubs in his pro career: CSK VVS Samara, Spartak St. Petersburg, Nizhny Novgorod, UNICS Kazan, and Zenit St. Petersburg.

Following the 2016–17 campaign, Antipov signed with Lokomotiv Kuban.

He signed with UNICS Kazan on June 18, 2020.

On July 26, 2021, he has signed third time with Nizhny Novgorod of the VTB United League.

Russian national team
Antipov was a member of the junior national teams of Russia. With Russia's university national team, he won the gold medal at the 2013 World University Games, and the bronze medal at the 2015 World University Games.

References

External links
 Euroleague.net Profile
 FIBA.com Profile
 FIBA Europe Profile
 Draftexpress.com Profile
 Eurobasket.com Profile

1991 births
Living people
BC Nizhny Novgorod players
BC Spartak Saint Petersburg players
BC UNICS players
BC Zenit Saint Petersburg players
Medalists at the 2013 Summer Universiade
Power forwards (basketball)
Russian men's basketball players
Small forwards
Universiade bronze medalists for Russia
Universiade gold medalists for Russia
Universiade medalists in basketball